Hodge is an unincorporated community in the Mojave Desert, within San Bernardino County, California, United States.

History
The settlement was named after ranch owners Gilbert and Robert Hodge. Hodge was a railroad station, supplying water from wells into the usually subterranean Mojave River. It was a desert stop on U.S. Route 66 between Barstow and Victorville. By 1952 Hodge was no longer active until new houses were built in the late 1980s.

References

Unincorporated communities in San Bernardino County, California
Populated places in the Mojave Desert
Mojave River
U.S. Route 66 in California
Unincorporated communities in California